Clytoscopa is a genus of moths of the family Noctuidae.

Species
 Clytoscopa iorrhoda Turner, 1931
 Clytoscopa serena Turner, 1931

References
 Clytoscopa at Markku Savela's Lepidoptera and Some Other Life Forms
 Natural History Museum Lepidoptera genus database

Acontiinae